KYTT (K-Light 98.7 FM) is a Christian radio station licensed to Coos Bay, Oregon.  The station is owned by Lighthouse Radio Group.

Programming
KYTT's programming primarily includes Contemporary Christian Music, with some Christian talk and teaching programs. Christian talk and teaching shows heard on KYTT include; Turning Point with David Jeremiah, Revive our Hearts with Nancy Leigh DeMoss, Focus On The Family, and Unshackled!.

History
The station began broadcasting November 19, 1978, and held the call sign KICR. The station originally broadcast at 98.3 MHz, and was owned by Intercontinental Ministries. The station aired a format consisting of religious programming, beautiful music, and classical music. In 1983, the station's call sign was changed to KYTT-FM. By 1984, the station was airing entirely religious programming. By 1985, the station's frequency had been changed to 98.7 MHz.

References

External links
KYTT's official website

YTT-FM
Coos Bay, Oregon
Radio stations established in 1978
1978 establishments in Oregon